Glenays, also known as Leighton House, was an historic home which was located in Radnor Township, Delaware County, Pennsylvania.

History and architectural features
The property was purchased by Richard Roger Montgomery and his wife Elisabeth Binney Montgomery in 1859. It was a three-story, stucco over stone Italian Villa style dwelling built in three sections.  

The first section was built in 1859, with additions built in the late-nineteenth century and in 1925.  The 1925 addition and 1928 garden walls were designed by architect George Howe (1886–1955).

For many years, the estate was the home of Archibald R. Montgomery and later, the residence of Mr. and Mrs. Alexander Biddle. In 1974, it was used as the "Designers' Show House" by the Philadelphia Vassar Club to benefit their scholarship fund. 

As of 2017, it was abandoned and in a state of disrepair. As of 2021, the land was subdivided, and the mansion demolished to make way for new residential construction.

It was added to the National Register of Historic Places in 1977.

References

Houses on the National Register of Historic Places in Pennsylvania
Italianate architecture in Pennsylvania
Houses completed in 1859
Houses in Delaware County, Pennsylvania
National Register of Historic Places in Delaware County, Pennsylvania
Radnor Township, Delaware County, Pennsylvania